Mkhitar or Mekhitar or Mechitar or Latinized Mechitarius is a common Armenian male given name. See Մխիթար for more on the origin of the name.

The surname Mkhitaryan is from this name.

Persons
Notable people bearing this name include:
Historical
 Mekhitar of Sebaste (1676–1749), founder of the Mekhitarists
 Mekhitar of Ayrivank (1222–1307), compiler of a canon of holy books, composer officer.
 Mkhitar Gosh (1130–1213), a scholar, writer, public figure, thinker, and priest.
 Mkhitar Sparapet (?-1730), a military commander
 Mkhitar Heratsi, an Armenian physician of the 12th century
Contemporary
 Mkhitar Djrbashian (1918–1994), a notable Armenian mathematician.
 Mkhitar Manukyan (born 1973), an Armenian wrestler
 Mkhitar Mnatsakanyan (born 1950), Armenian politician and minister

Others
 Mkhitar Sebastatsi Educational Complex, a public school in Malatia-Sebastia District of Yerevan, Armenia

See also
Mkhitaryan / Mkhitarian

Given names
Armenian masculine given names